FMV may refer to:

 Full motion video, a video game narration technique that relies upon pre-recorded video files
 FMV (catamaran), a vessel that was sailed across the Atlantic Ocean in 1981
 Swedish Defence Materiel Administration, Sweden
 Faculty of International Relations, University of Economics in Bratislava, faculty of the University of Economics in Bratislava
 Fair market value, an estimate of the market value of a property
 Fig mosaic virus, a segmented, negative sense, single-stranded RNA virus
 Function multi-versioning, an optimization technique in computing